Charles "CJ" Nana Kwabena Sapong (born December 27, 1988) is an American professional soccer player who plays as a forward for Major League Soccer club Nashville SC. Born in Manassas, Virginia, Sapong was part of the D.C. United youth academy before playing college soccer for the James Madison Dukes. After playing four seasons with James Madison, Sapong was drafted in the first round of the 2011 MLS SuperDraft by Sporting Kansas City as the 11th overall pick.

After his debut professional season, Sapong was named the MLS Rookie of the Year for 2011. In 2012, Sapong won his first championship, helping Kansas City win the U.S. Open Cup. He then was part of the side that won MLS Cup in 2013. Prior to the 2015 season, Sapong was traded to the Philadelphia Union. He played for the Union for three seasons, converting from a winger to a forward, before being traded to the Chicago Fire in 2019. Sapong has also represented the United States internationally, earning four caps between 2012 and 2018.

Playing career

College
Sapong played college soccer at James Madison University, where he ended his career with 37 goals and 21 assists in four seasons from 2007–2010. He was awarded First Team All-Conference and team Offensive MVP honors all four years, a first in program history, and was the CAA Player of the Year as a senior co-captain in 2010. Sapong  was a two-time NSCAA First Team All-South Atlantic Region selection. As a freshman, he was named the CAA and VaSID Rookie of the Year and chosen to the Third Team All-South Atlantic Region.

Sapong made eight appearances for Fredericksburg Gunners in the USL Premier Development League in 2009, and made eleven appearances and scored four goals for Reading United during their 2010 PDL season.

Club

Sporting Kansas City
 On January 14, 2011, Sapong was drafted #10 overall in the 2011 MLS SuperDraft by Sporting Kansas City. He signed with the club on March 1, 2011. He made his professional debut on March 19, in Kansas City's opening game of the 2011 MLS season against Chivas USA; he scored his first professional goal after just two minutes of the game, helping his team to a 3–2 victory. Sapong was awarded the MLS Rookie of the Year Award for 2011, edging out Perry Kitchen and Michael Farfan, who finished second and third, respectively.

Orlando City
Sapong was loaned to USL Pro's Orlando City in July 2013. On July 18, only a week after being loaned to Orlando, Sapong was recalled by Sporting Kansas City. In total, Sapong scored one goal in three matches while tallying one assist.

Philadelphia Union
On December 8, 2014, Sapong was traded by Kansas City to Philadelphia Union in exchange for a first-round pick in the 2015 MLS SuperDraft. After several seasons of being deployed on the wing with Kansas City, Sapong was positioned as the Union's lone center forward, taking advantage of his strength and hold-up play. He led the Union in goals during the 2015 season (with 9) and would build on those totals in subsequent seasons. He scored his first career hat-trick in Philadelphia's 3–0 victory over the New York Red Bulls at Talen Energy Stadium on May 6, 2017.

On October 22, 2017, Sapong broke the Union's (and his own) single-season scoring record, previously held by Sebastian Le Toux (14 goals during the 2010 season). At home against Orlando City, on the final day of the season, Sapong scored his fifteenth and sixteenth goals for the record.

Chicago Fire
On February 23, 2019, Sapong was traded by Philadelphia to Chicago Fire in exchange for up to $450,000 in Allocation Money.

The specifics of the Allocation Money are as follows: $200,000 in 2019 General Allocation Money, $100,000 in 2020 Targeted Allocation Money, and an additional $100,000 in 2019 General Allocation Money to be conveyed to Philadelphia should the Chicago Fire acquire said funds this year.

If the Fire do not acquire an additional $100,000 in 2019 General Allocation Money to convey to Philadelphia this season, then that money conveys as GAM in 2020, and the Union also receive $50,000 in 2020 Targeted Allocation Money from Chicago should Sapong hit certain performance incentives in 2019.

Sapong's contract with the club expired at the end of the 2020 season.

Nashville SC
On February 10, 2021, Sapong signed as a free agent with Nashville SC.

International
On January 21, 2012, Sapong made his debut for the senior side of the United States (as a second-half substitute) in the 1–0 win over Venezuela in a friendly match. On November 14, 2017, Sapong made his first start for the United States in a friendly against Portugal, notching an assist with an incisive pass to Weston McKennie.

Personal life
Born in the United States, Sapong is of Ghanaian descent. On February 23, 2017, Sapong helped launch the Sacred Seeds foundation, which promotes and enhances the growth of underserved communities through sustenance and self-sustainability. He was inspired by his own experiences recovering from injuries during his soccer career and being reluctant to rely on painkillers rather than more nutritional methods.

On May 1, 2015, Sapong was arrested for DUI and reckless driving. He was found not guilty of the DUI charge but still faced the reckless driving charge and was still forced to have attended an MLS league-mandated stint at a treatment facility in Malibu, California. Sapong has credited the experience with having "changed [his] life."

Career statistics

Club

International

Honors
Sporting Kansas City
MLS Cup: 2013
U.S. Open Cup: 2012

Individual
MLS Rookie of the Year: 2011

References

External links
 
 
 
 
 Sacred Seeds

1988 births
Living people
American soccer players
African-American soccer players
James Madison Dukes men's soccer players
Fredericksburg Gunners players
Reading United A.C. players
Sporting Kansas City players
Orlando City SC (2010–2014) players
Philadelphia Union players
Chicago Fire FC players
Nashville SC players
American people of Ghanaian descent
People from Manassas, Virginia
Soccer players from Virginia
Sporting Kansas City draft picks
USL League Two players
Major League Soccer players
USL Championship players
United States men's international soccer players
Association football forwards
21st-century African-American sportspeople
20th-century African-American people